The Men's 200 metre individual medley competition of the 2018 European Aquatics Championships was held on 5 and 6 August 2018.

Records
Prior to the competition, the existing world and championship records were as follows.

Results

Heats
The heats were started on 5 August at 09:30.

Semifinals
The semifinals were started on 5 August at 18:26.

Semifinal 1

Semifinal 2

Final
The final was started on 6 August at 18:15.

References

Men's 200 metre individual medley